Vesyolaya Polyana is a rural locality (a khutor) in Vyshnederevensky Selsoviet Rural Settlement, Lgovsky District, Kursk Oblast, Russia. Population:

Geography 
The khutor is located in the Apoka River basin (a left tributary of the Seym), 42 km from the Russia–Ukraine border, 67.5 km south-west of Kursk, 6.5 km south of the district center – the town Lgov, 5.5 km from the selsoviet center – Vyshniye Derevenki.

 Climate
Vesyolaya Polyana has a warm-summer humid continental climate (Dfb in the Köppen climate classification).

Transport 
Vesyolaya Polyana is located 3.5 km from the road of regional importance  (Kursk – Lgov – Rylsk – border with Ukraine), 1.5 km from the road  (Lgov – Sudzha), 1 km from the road of intermunicipal significance  (38K-017 – Arsenyevka – Kochanovka – the railway halt 387 km), 6 km from the nearest railway halt 387 km (railway line 322 km – Lgov I).

The rural locality is situated 74.5 km from Kursk Vostochny Airport, 141 km from Belgorod International Airport and 277 km from Voronezh Peter the Great Airport.

References

Notes

Sources

Rural localities in Lgovsky District